The following is a list of episodes of the anime television series Doraemon (2005 anime).

2005

2006

2007

2008

2009

Doraemon Mini Theater
Doraemon Mini Theater consists of short segments that aired in between segments of early episodes of the series.

References

External links
 Doraemon Full Episode Database (Japanese)

Doraemon 2005
Episodes 2005
Episodes 2005